Gaspare Viviani (died 25 January 1605) was a Roman Catholic prelate who served as Bishop of Anagni (1579–1605), Bishop of Hierapetra et Sitia (1571–1579), and Bishop of Sitia (1556–1571).

Biography
On 17 July 1556, Gaspare Viviani was appointed during the papacy of Pope Paul IV as Bishop of Sitia. On 16 July 1571, he was appointed during the papacy of Pope Pius V as Bishop of Hierapetra et Sitia. On 3 August 1579, he was appointed during the papacy of Pope Gregory XIII as Bishop of Anagni. He served as Bishop of Anagni until his death on 25 January 1605.

Episcopal succession
While bishop, he was the principal co-consecrator of: 
Giovanni Battista Soriani, Bishop of Bisceglie (1576); 
Giovanni Battista Ansaldo, Bishop of Cariati e Cerenzia (1576); 
Giovanni Bernardino Grandopoli, Bishop of Lettere-Gragnano (1576); 
Miguel Thomàs de Taxaquet, Bishop of Lérida (1577); and 
Mario Bolognini, Archbishop of Lanciano (1579).

References

External links and additional sources
 (for Chronology of Bishops)
 (for Chronology of Bishops)

16th-century Italian Roman Catholic bishops
17th-century Italian Roman Catholic bishops
Bishops appointed by Pope Paul IV
Bishops appointed by Pope Pius V
Bishops appointed by Pope Gregory XIII
1605 deaths